Mythimna litoralis, the shore wainscot, is a moth of the family Noctuidae.

A strictly coastal species, it is found in Europe and Morocco in areas close to the shore. The wingspan is 36–42 mm. It is an ochre-colored moth having a distinctive white streak bordered with dark fine lines along the length of the forewing.

Technical description and variation

The wingspan is 36–42 mm. Forewing smooth pale ochreous suffused with brown except along costa;median vein white, outlined with fuscous; the nervules towards termen whitish; the terminal interspaces with brown streaks; hindwing pure white. A coast species found in Britain, Denmark, N. Germany, the Netherlands, Belgium, France, and Spain.

Larva reddish yellow; dorsal line fine, pale with dark edges; subdorsal lines blackish; spiracles black on a pale lateral stripe; head and thoracic plate yellowish. The larvae are monophagous, feeding exclusively on marram (Ammophila arenaria) leaves, a plant that grows on dunes along the shoreline.

References

External links

Shore wainscot at UKmoths
Funet Taxonomy
Fauna Europaea
Lepiforum.de

Mythimna (moth)
Moths described in 1827
Moths of Africa
Moths of Europe
Taxa named by John Curtis